Rouleau  is a town in southern Saskatchewan, Canada, located on the Canadian Prairies. It lies within census Division No. 6 and rural municipality Redburn No. 130.

As of 2011, the population was 453 (an increase of 13.3 percent from the 2006 census), in an area of 1.65 square kilometres.  Rouleau is situated on Saskatchewan Highway 39 and is about 35 km southwest of Regina.

The town was notably the filming location of the popular Canadian sitcom Corner Gas, depicting the fictitious town of Dog River.

History 

A post office was established at Rouleau in the provisional District of Assiniboia, North West Territories, as early as April 1, 1895. It incorporated as a village on July 23, 1903.

Rouleau was named after Charles Borromée Rouleau. Rouleau was a magistrate in Battleford from 1883 until 1887 and served in the 1st Council of the North-West Territories.

Demographics 

Climate

Corner Gas 

The town is best known as the main filming location for the CTV television series Corner Gas. The series' production team built a full-size mock gas station and coffee shop at the western entrance of the town for filming, causing confusion among visitors thinking Corner Gas and The Ruby were real establishments. The town's grain elevator was also repainted with the name "Dog River" as it appears in the background of many episodes of the series.

For an episode which aired in early 2007, then-Prime Minister Stephen Harper stopped in Rouleau to play a cameo role in the television show Corner Gas.

The buildings used as sets for the program were allowed to fall into disrepair after the show wrapped up production. They were purchased by an entrepreneur, Sylvain Senecal, who converted them into a museum and souvenir shop. The set was demolished in November 2016.

The grain elevator was destroyed in a fire on November 5, 2021.

Notable people 

Keith Aulie, professional ice hockey defenseman, with EHC Red Bull München in the Deutsche Eishockey Liga.
Edson Garfield Bahr was a pitcher in Major League Baseball who played for the Pittsburgh Pirates from 1946 to 1947.
Ken Doraty, professional hockey player, who was born in Stittsville, Ontario, but moved to Rouleau when he was five.
Marsha Kennedy, painter and instructor at the University of Regina.
Daryl Seaman, businessman and Hockey Hall of Fame member, was born in Rouleau in 1922.

References 

Towns in Saskatchewan
Redburn No. 130, Saskatchewan
Division No. 6, Saskatchewan